Scott Spencer may refer to:

 Scott Spencer (writer) (born 1945), American writer
 Scott Spencer (footballer) (born 1989), English footballer